Sosxetra is a monotypic moth genus of the family Noctuidae. Its only species, Sosxetra grata, is found in Brazil. Both the genus and the species were described by Francis Walker in 1862.

References

Calpinae
Monotypic moth genera